Tirioro Kamoriki Willie was an I-Kiribati track and field sprinter who competed for Kiribati at the 2018 Commonwealth Games. At the games, Willie was scheduled to compete in heat one against six other athletes including Cejhae Greene. Willie finished 7th at the end of the race with a time of 11.45 seconds and did not advance through to the later rounds of competition.
He was selected to be the only athlete from Kiribati at the 2019 World Athletics Championships in Doha.

References

1999 births
2022 deaths
Commonwealth Games competitors for Kiribati
Athletes (track and field) at the 2018 Commonwealth Games
I-Kiribati male sprinters
People from the Gilbert Islands